Linaria genistifolia is a species of flowering plant belonging to the family Plantaginaceae.

Its native range is from Europe to southwestern Siberia and China.

References

genistifolia